David Lloyd Mundy (born 30 June 1947) is an Australian baseballer and cricketer who was an inaugural inductee to the Baseball Australia Hall of Fame in 2005.

Baseball career
Mundy played for South Australia in the Claxton Shield from 1965 to 1981. He also represented Australia at a national level from 1966 to 1979, highlighted by a bronze medal at the 1975 Asian Baseball Championship.

Cricket career
Mundy also played in two first-class matches for South Australia in 1969/70.

See also
 List of South Australian representative cricketers

References

External links
 

1947 births
Living people
Australian cricketers
South Australia cricketers
Cricketers from Adelaide